FCT, the International Symposia on Fundamentals of Computation Theory is a biennial series of conferences in the field of theoretical computer science. It was established in 1977 for researchers interested in all aspects of theoretical computer science, and in particular algorithms, computational complexity, formal and logical methods. FCT was previously held at the following institutions.

See also 

 Conferences in theoretical computer science.
 The list of computer science conferences contains other academic conferences in computer science.

References

External links
 FCT steering committee.
 FCT proceedings information in DBLP.
 FCT 2015 web site.
 FCT 2013 web site.
 FCT 2011 web site.
 FCT 2009 web site.
 FCT 2007 web site.
 FCT 2005 web site.
 FCT 2001 web site.

Theoretical computer science conferences
Recurring events established in 1977